Stojan "Stojko" Vranković (born 22 January 1964) is a Croatian professional basketball executive and former player. He served as the president of the Croatian Basketball Federation from 2016 to 2022. 

A 7 ft 2 in (2.18 m) center, he played five seasons (1990–1992; 1996–1999) in the National Basketball Association (NBA), as a member of the Boston Celtics, Minnesota Timberwolves, and Los Angeles Clippers. He was popular in Europe while playing for the Athens-based club Panathinaikos, with whom he won the club's first EuroLeague championship.

Club career
A renowned shot blocker, Vranković made little impact in the NBA, managing small minutes and a low scoring average even though he started 73 out of 170 games played. He did however have a major impact in Europe playing for the Greek League team Panathinaikos. For a short spell in the winter of 1994-95, Vrankovic thrilled fans of the Greek team by adding 3-point shots to his usual repertoire of slam dunks, hook shots, and blocked shots. One game, against Benfica in the EuroLeague in February 1995, exemplified this, as Vrankovic top-scored with 23 points and finished the game with a 3-point shot followed by a coast-to-coast dunk. Vrankovic had first taken a 3-point shot in the Greek League All-Star Game held at the Peace and Friendship Stadium in Piraeus in December 1994, and seemed as surprised as everyone in the stadium when it went in. In 1996, he combined with Dominique Wilkins to lead Panathinaikos to a EuroLeague championship - a first for the club. Vranković's defensive contribution was vital, namely his block of Željko Rebrača at the buzzer, in the third game of the quarter-finals against Benetton Treviso, sending Panathinaikos through. In the EuroLeague Finals, his block to deny Barcelona the lead in the last second, gave the game a dramatic end, before falling to the ground in the ensuing hustle and clutching his knee in pain at the buzzer. In an interview at the official EuroLeague Final Four website, Panathinaikos captain Panagiotis Giannakis described the incident as follows:

"All that happened at the end of the game is unbelievable, a few seconds that lasted one century! I remember Stojko [Vranković] running like...Carl Lewis from one side to the other, to stop (José Antonio) Montero. He blocked the layup, almost at the buzzer, and he sealed the victory."

National team career

Yugoslavia
Vranković earned a silver medal at the 1988 Seoul Summer Olympic Games with the senior Yugoslav national team.

Croatia
At the following 1992 Barcelona Summer Olympic Games, he got the silver medal after Croatia lost to the USA in the men's final against "The Dream Team", while playing for the senior Croatian national team.

Administrative career

Croatian Basketball Federation president (2016–2022)
On November 19, 2016, Vranković became the president of the Croatian Basketball Federation (HKS). On June 15, 2019, he was re-elected as the HKS president until 2023. On September  12, 2022, after a poor performance of the Croatia men's national basketball team at the EuroBasket 2022, Vranković resigned form his position.

Personal life
Vranković was a close friend of the fellow Croatian basketball player Dražen Petrović. He was a coffin bearer at Petrović's funeral in 1993, and has been active in commemorating his memory. In an article at the FIBA website concerning the opening of a museum in Dražen's honour, Vranković was quoted as saying: "I would like to thank all those involved in creating this place, so children would be able to learn more about basketball's Amadeus". Vranković and his wife Lovorka have two daughters, Andrea and Matea, and one son, Antonio, who plays for Croatian club Split.

References

External links
Euroleague.net Profile
Fibaeurope.com Profile
NBA stats at basketball-reference

1964 births
Living people
1986 FIBA World Championship players
Aris B.C. players
Basketball executives
Basketball players at the 1988 Summer Olympics
Basketball players at the 1992 Summer Olympics
Basketball players at the 1996 Summer Olympics
Boston Celtics players
Centers (basketball)
Croatian expatriate basketball people in Greece
Croatian expatriate basketball people in Italy
Croatian expatriate basketball people in the United States
Croatian sports executives and administrators
Croatian men's basketball players
FIBA EuroBasket-winning players
Fortitudo Pallacanestro Bologna players
KK Zadar players
Lega Basket Serie A players
Los Angeles Clippers players
Medalists at the 1987 Summer Universiade
Medalists at the 1988 Summer Olympics
Medalists at the 1992 Summer Olympics
Minnesota Timberwolves players
National Basketball Association players from Croatia
Olympic basketball players of Croatia
Olympic basketball players of Yugoslavia
Olympic medalists in basketball
Olympic silver medalists for Croatia
Olympic silver medalists for Yugoslavia
Panathinaikos B.C. players
Sportspeople from Drniš
Serbs of Croatia
Undrafted National Basketball Association players
Universiade gold medalists for Yugoslavia
Universiade medalists in basketball
Yugoslav men's basketball players